Sharlto Copley (born 27 November 1973) is a South African actor. His acting credits include roles in the Academy Award-nominated science fiction film District 9, the 2010 adaptation of The A-Team, the science fiction film Elysium, the science fiction horror film Europa Report and the dark fantasy adventure film Maleficent. He also played the title character in the science fiction film Chappie, Jimmy in Hardcore Henry, and starred in two seasons as Christian Walker of the TV series Powers. Copley is married to fellow South African actress and supermodel Tanit Phoenix.

Early life
Sharlto Copley was born in Johannesburg and educated at St. Andrew's Preparatory School in Grahamstown and Redhill School in Morningside, Johannesburg. His father is Dr. Bruce Copley, a former university professor. His brother, Donovan, is the lead singer of the Cape Town band Hot Water.

Career

Shortly after leaving high school, Copley met Neill Blomkamp, who is younger than him. Copley allowed Blomkamp to use computers at his production company to help the company pitch various projects and allow Blomkamp to pursue his passion and talent for 3D animation and design.

In Peter Jackson and Neill Blomkamp's District 9 (2009), Copley played the lead role of Wikus van der Merwe, an Afrikaner bureaucrat assigned to move a race of extraterrestrial creatures stranded on Earth. In the film, the aliens, popularly and derogatorily referred to as "prawns", must be moved from District 9, a military-guarded slum in Johannesburg, South Africa, to an internment camp outside the city. Copley improvised all of his dialogue. At the 2009 IGN Summer Movie awards, Copley won Favorite Hero  and Best Performance.

In 2010 Copley produced, wrote, and directed an insert for the South African Film and Television Awards called "Wikus and Charlize", featuring fellow South African star Charlize Theron. The clip features Copley as Wikus attempting to track down Charlize Theron in Hollywood to help him present the Award for Best Afrikaans Pop album.

Copley then starred alongside Liam Neeson, Bradley Cooper, and Quinton "Rampage" Jackson in the feature film adaptation of The A-Team, which was produced by Ridley Scott and Tony Scott. Copley used a Southern American dialect for his portrayal of A-Team member H. M. Murdock, and employed other dialects, including Scottish, English, Australian and his native South African, as part of the character's rapid-fire style. Dwight Schultz, who played Murdock in the original TV series, praised Copley's performance and said Copley was the only actor he knew of who was "true to his character."

Copley guest-co-hosted WWE Raw on 7 June 2010, along with his A-Team co-stars Cooper and Jackson.

In 2013, Copley played fictional astronaut James Corrigan in Europa Report, the story of a crew of international astronauts sent on a private mission to Jupiter's fourth moon. The same year, Copley portrayed the villain Agent Kruger in Elysium, a science fiction film written and directed by Blomkamp, starring Matt Damon and Jodie Foster.

Copley played villain Adrian Pryce in Spike Lee's Oldboy, a remake of the 2003 South Korean film of the same name. He also starred opposite Angelina Jolie in the 2014 Disney film Maleficent and played King Stefan, Princess Aurora's father. He also provided the voice, reference work, and interaction with the cast as Chappie, the titular character of the 2015 film Chappie, also directed by Neill Blomkamp.

In 2015, Copley was announced to star as Christian Walker in the superhero TV series Powers. He later provided the voiceover for the e-tron GT concept promotional video by Audi Sport GmbH.

Also in 2015, Copley played the supporting character Jimmy in the film Hardcore Henry

In March 2018, Copley starred in the crime comedy film Gringo as Mitch Rusk. Copley portrayed the titular character of a biographical film about Ted Kaczynski titled Ted K.

Personal life
Copley has been in a relationship with actress and supermodel Tanit Phoenix since January 2012. They wed on 15 February 2016, in Cape Town, South Africa. The couple have a daughter together.

Copley resides in Cape Town and Los Angeles.

Filmography

Film

Television

Video games

Web

Awards and nominations

References

External links
 
 

Living people
1973 births
21st-century South African male actors
Male actors from Johannesburg
South African expatriates in the United States
South African male film actors
South African male television actors
White South African people